This is a list of National Park System areas in New York.

New York has 24 service areas included in the United States' National Park Service (NPS) system.

Current NPS areas

Former NPS areas
There are some former designations in New York. (development needed)

See also
List of National Park System areas in Maryland

References

New York